Lentzea flaviverrucosa is a Gram-positive bacterium from the genus Lentzea which has been isolated from soil in China.

References

Pseudonocardiales
Bacteria described in 1966